Silvério Júnio Gonçalves Silva (born 26 December 1995), known as Silvério, is a Portuguese footballer who plays for Penafiel as a defender.

Football career
Born in Vila do Conde, Silvério spent his entire youth career at hometown club Rio Ave F.C. and was an unused substitute for a handful of Primeira Liga games, but never made a senior appearance. In January 2014, he and fellow local Nélson Monte signed five-year professional contracts.

In August 2014, Silvério was loaned to third-tier club F.C. Famalicão, which was renewed a year later after the club won promotion. On 16 September 2015, he made his professional debut in a 2–2 draw at U.D. Oliveirense.

In July 2016, Silvério and Rio Ave teammate Sunday Abalo were loaned to Leixões S.C. for the upcoming second division campaign. Two years later, on the final day of business, he was loaned to neighbours Varzim S.C. at the same level.

Silvério left Rio Ave on 1 July 2019 for Académica de Coimbra OAF, signed by his former Varzim boss César Peixoto. Two years later, he moved to F.C. Penafiel.

References

External links
 
 Stats and profile at LPFP 
 

1995 births
People from Vila do Conde
Living people
Portuguese footballers
Association football defenders
Rio Ave F.C. players
F.C. Famalicão players
Leixões S.C. players
Varzim S.C. players
Associação Académica de Coimbra – O.A.F. players
F.C. Penafiel players
Liga Portugal 2 players
Campeonato de Portugal (league) players
Sportspeople from Porto District